Ghayba or al-Ghayba ('Occultation', 'Concealment') may refer to:

Occultation (Islam),  Shi'ite eschatological belief in the concealment and subsequent reemergence of an Imam or Mahdi, who will establish justice and peace on earth in the end of time
Minor Occultation, first period of concealment of the Imam (874–941) in Twelver Shi'ism, during which the twelfth and last Imam Muhammad al-Mahdi is believed to have communicated regularly with his followers through four successive agents
Major Occultation, second period of concealment of the Imam (941–present) in Twelver Shi'ism, during which the hidden Imam Muhammad al-Mahdi is believed to be without agent

See also
Rajʿa ('return'), the concomitant concept of return after occultation

, a work written in 1021 by the Druze leader Hamza ibn Ali after the disappearance of the Fatimid Imam-caliph al-Hakim bi-Amr Allah (985–1021), announcing al-Hakim's occultation
, a work written in 1042 by Hamza ibn Ali's pupil Baha al-Din al-Muqtana, announcing the suspension of Druze missionary activity due to the imminence of the end times